The Predators (typeset as THE PREDATORS) is a Japanese rock supergroup formed in 2005 by Sawao Yamanaka (The Pillows), Yoshihito "Jiro" Wayama (Glay) and Shinpei Nakayama (Straightener). In 2010 Nakayama left and was replaced by Hirotaka Takahashi (Ellegarden). Originally on their own record label Three Mountain, name chosen because all three original members have the word "yama" (mountain) in their last name, they were then on Avex Trax from 2008 until 2015, when they switched to Yamanaka's own Delicious Label.

History 
Jiro became a fan of The Pillows during the "Runners High" tour in 1999, and he and Sawao Yamanaka became good friends. In 2001, Jiro and Sawao did a cover session of Nirvana together, they wanted to work together. In 2004, Jiro participated in the recording of The Pillows' 15th anniversary tribute album Synchronized Rockers, where he met Shinpei Nakayama, saw his drumming style and thought he was quite talented. And so when the chance came, Jiro and Sawao asked Shinpei if he wanted to form a band together.

The formation of The Predators was officially announced in print and on radio on May 14, 2005. Their debut mini-album Hunting!!! was released on July 6, 2005 and debuted at number 5 on the Oricon chart. After the release of the mini-album and participation in some festivals, the band went sabbatical as members continued their main bands' activities.

On August 17 and 18, 2007, The Predators returned with a performance at the "Rising Sun Rock Festival". On October 15, 2008, the band released its second mini-album, Kiba wo Misero, which debuted at number 4 on the Oricon chart. The band played the tour "Shoot the Moon" during October and November. In 2010, the band announced the departure of Shinpei and the entry of Hirotaka Takahashi (Ellegarden). On August 4, the band released its third mini-album This World, which debuted at number 7 on the Oricon chart.

Members 
 Sawao Yamanaka (山中さわお) – vocals, guitar (The Pillows)
Yoshihito "Jiro" Wayama (ジロウ) – bass (Glay)
Hirotaka Takahashi (高橋宏貴) – drums (Ellegarden)

Former members 
Shinpei Nakayama (ナカヤマシンペイ) – drums (Straightener)

Discography 
 Hunting!!! (July 6, 2005)
"Bakuon Drop"
"Recall Me"
"Dizzy Life"
"Sleepy Dragon"
"Mustang Hippy"
"Lizard Man"
"Last Hunting"

 Kiba wo Misero (October 15, 2008)
"Rock'N'Roll Lay Down"
"C.R.S"
"Live Drive"
"Shoot the Moon"
"Gun Lock"
"Island"
"Wild Tiger"

 This World (August 4, 2010)
"Brain Cally"
"Trip Rock"
"This World"
"The Requiem (Without the Titles)"
"Desperate Donor"
"Good by Goblin"
"Tyrant"

 Monster in My head (August 1, 2012)
"God Game"
"Monster in My head"
"Risky Revolution"
"Crazy Babar"
"Mission"
"Hurry up! Jerry!"
"Monkeyshine"

 Rock'N'Roll Pandemic (August 26, 2015)
"Nightless City"
"Smoky Surf Shop Boogie"
"Laid Back Boys Blue"
"Walk on This Way!"
"Start!"
"Bite and Fight!"
"Typhoon Jenny"

 "Arabian Dance" (January 10, 2018)
"Arabian Dance"
"Spooky Trouble"
"Trade"
"Trinity"

References 
 Live Journal Fan Community

External links 
 Official site

Japanese alternative rock groups
Rock music supergroups
Japanese musical trios
Musical groups established in 2005